"Unification" is a two-part episode of the syndicated American science fiction television series Star Trek: The Next Generation which features Leonard Nimoy as Spock. The first of the two episodes earned a 15.4 household Nielsen rating, drawing over 25 million viewers, making it one of the most watched episodes in all seven seasons of The Next Generations run.

Set in the 24th century, the series follows the adventures of the Starfleet crew of the Federation starship Enterprise-D. In this episode, Picard is in search of ambassador Spock who may have defected to the Romulan Empire. 
This episode has been praised for the "novelty and nostalgia" of seeing Spock, and noted for introducing a peace-loving Romulan faction.
Story elements and appearances by Spock are included in "Unification III" in Star Trek Discovery.

Plot

Part I
Starfleet Admiral Brackett informs Captain Picard (Patrick Stewart) that Ambassador Spock (Leonard Nimoy) is missing and an intelligence scan has placed him on Romulus, raising fears that he may have defected. Picard orders the Enterprise to Vulcan to speak to Spock's ailing father, Sarek (Mark Lenard), with whom Picard shares a close bond, due to their mind meld in a previous episode. Sarek mentions Pardek, a Romulan Senator with whom Spock had been maintaining a dialogue for several decades. Lieutenant Commander Data (Brent Spiner) discovers a visual record of Pardek from a trade conference and confirms that he is the figure seen on the intelligence scan of Spock on Romulus. The Enterprise crew find the remains of a decommissioned Vulcan ship, the T'Pau, in the debris of a Ferengi ship which crashed in the Hanolin asteroid belt.

Picard calls in a favor from Chancellor Gowron (Robert O'Reilly), speaking to one of his aides and convincing him to lend them a Klingon ship that could take them to Romulus while cloaked.  Picard and Data board the ship, with Picard ordering Riker to investigate the T'Pau and try to find a link to the Romulans.  En route, the Klingons inform Picard that they intercepted a message of interest to him:  Sarek has died.

On Romulus, Picard and Data (disguised as Romulans) locate the spot where the picture of Pardek and Spock was taken, which Data determines is an intelligence bureau building. They wait until Pardek arrives, but when they approach him they find themselves met by soldiers and taken to a cavern. Pardek arrives, explaining that Romulan security knew they were on-planet and they've been brought underground for their safety. Picard states that he is looking for Ambassador Spock, who emerges from a nearby tunnel.

Part II
Spock demands that Picard leave Romulus. Picard informs him of the Federation's concern over his "cowboy diplomacy" and tells him that Sarek has died. Spock takes the news of his father's death stoically. He explains to Picard that during the peace negotiations with the Klingons decades earlier, he felt responsible for putting Captain Kirk and his crew at risk, and so is now working alone on a "personal mission of peace" to re-unify the Vulcan and Romulan people. He is working with an underground movement to achieve that aim. Pardek has asked Spock to come to Romulus to meet with the new Proconsul of the Romulan Senate, a young idealist who has promised reforms. Picard expresses concern that the willingness of the Romulans may be part of a larger ploy. Spock agrees but points out that if a larger plot is at work, it is best they play out their roles within it to uncover it. On the Klingon ship Spock and Data work together to break a Romulan code, and complement one another. Spock remarks that Data has achieved the ideal Vulcan state of pure logic without emotion, and Data remarks that Spock feels emotion, which Data is trying achieve.

Picard, Data, and Spock are soon captured by Commander Sela (Tasha Yar's daughter), who is planning a Romulan conquest of Vulcan. The stolen Vulcan ship and two others are carrying a 2,000 men Romulan invasion force, under the guise of escorting a peace envoy. Spock refuses to deceive his people by announcing the false news, even after Sela threatens to kill him, and she locks the three in her office and leaves to order the ships on their way. By the time she returns, Data has hacked into the Romulan computer system and created a holographic simulation that distracts her long enough for the three captives to incapacitate her and her officers.

Meanwhile, the Enterprise arrives at Galorndon Core, discovering the three Vulcan ships, and moves to block their approach to Vulcan. A medical distress signal comes in—a distraction created by Sela—but as Riker orders the ship toward its source, they receive a broadcast from Romulus in which Spock reveals the true nature of the Vulcan ships. A Romulan Warbird uncloaks, destroys the ships, and recloaks, killing the troops instead of allowing them to be captured.

On Romulus, Data and Picard bid farewell to Spock. The Ambassador is intent upon his goal, realizing that it cannot be achieved through diplomacy or politics but that the Vulcan philosophy is beginning to spread among the young persons of Romulus. Picard offers Spock a chance to touch what Sarek shared with him, and the two mind-meld.

Background
This episode was aired in the weeks before the release of Star Trek VI: The Undiscovered Country. Spock makes reference to the events of the movie when he asks Picard if he was aware of Spock's role in the first peace overtures to the Klingons. Picard is aware of the public history of Spock's role, but not the whole story. Spock says that he forced Captain Kirk to accept the mission, and that he felt responsible for what happened to Kirk and his crew. This time, Spock only wants to risk his own life, which is why he came to Romulus on his own.

Leonard Nimoy had previously requested $1 million to cameo in the series, but he took minimum SAG pay to reprise the role of Spock to publicize Star Trek VI: The Undiscovered Country, on which he was executive producer.

The Star Trek: Discovery episode "Unification III" is a sequel to this two-parter; it sees Romulan and Vulcan societies united and living on the (now-renamed) 31st Century Vulcan homeworld Ni'Var.

Production
This episode is one of four times that an original series character reprised his role in The Next Generation; the other three being "Encounter at Farpoint" (DeForest Kelley), "Sarek" (Mark Lenard), and "Relics" (James Doohan).

The episode was dedicated to the late Gene Roddenberry, who had died shortly prior to its broadcast.

Reception
In 2012, Tor.com's Keith DeCandido gave Part I of "Unification" a rating of 6/10, and Part II a rating of 4/10.

In 2017, Den of Geek included "Unification" as one of their 25 recommended episodes to watch of Star Trek: The Next Generation. In 2017, Den of Geek also ranked Mark Lenard as Sarek in Star Trek: The Next Generation as one of the top ten guest star roles on Star Trek: The Next Generation, noting his performances in "Sarek" and "Unification" (Part I).

In 2016, Empire ranked this the 29th best out of the top 50 episodes of all the 700-plus Star Trek television episodes, praising actor-director Leonard Nimoy reprising the character Spock, and his scenes with Jean-Luc Picard.

In 2018, CBR rated the "Unification" as the 9th best multi-episode story arc of Star Trek.

In 2019, the Edmonton Journal ranked this as having one of the top ten Spock character moments, pointing out the presentation of Spock with Spock's line "Indeed you have found him", references to Star Trek VI: The Undiscovered Country, and advancing the narrative between Spock and Sarek that began with the original series episode "Journey to Babel".

In 2019, Nerdist included this episode on their "Best of Spock" binge-watching guide. They suggested that Spock's devotion to uniting the Romulan and Vulcan people as depicted in this episode was a "metaphor for his own personal struggle".

In 2020, SyFy also recommended watching "Unification, Part I" and "Unification, Part II" as background on the Romulans for Star Trek: Picard.

In 2020, Space.com recommended watching this episode as background for Star Trek: Picard.

Home video 
Parts I and II of "Unification" were released on LaserDisc on February 18, 1997, in the United States.

Both parts of "Unification" were released in the United Kingdom on one VHS cassette (catalog number VH4104).

The episode was released in the United States on November 5, 2002, as part of the season five DVD box set.

On November 19, 2013, "Unification" was released in high-definition video on Blu-Ray disc, as a standalone product. (It was also released in the season box set)

The first Blu-ray release was in the United States on November 18, 2013, followed by the United Kingdom the next day, November 19, 2013.

Novel
A novelization of this episode was published by Pocket Books, it was one of five novelizations to be made of The Next Generation episodes, alongside "Encounter at Farpoint", "Descent", "Relics" , and "All Good Things...".

The 1995 Star Trek novel "Crossover" by Michael Jan Friedman is a story that follows up on the events in "Unification"; Spock continues to work on Vulcan, and once again Picard is involved, but also Ambassador McCoy and Scotty. The events of the novel are set after "All Good Things..." but before the movie Generations.

References

Works cited

External links

 

 

Star Trek: The Next Generation (season 5) episodes
1991 American television episodes
Television episodes written by Rick Berman
Star Trek: The Next Generation episodes in multiple parts